The Mission Viejo Vigilantes were a minor league baseball team located in Mission Viejo, California. The team played in the independent Western Baseball League, and was not affiliated with any Major League Baseball team. Their home stadium was Mission Viejo Stadium near Saddleback College.

The Vigilantes were founded in 1997 when the Long Beach Barracudas moved to Mission Viejo.  They ceased operations after the 1998 season.

External links
Baseball Reference

Western Baseball League teams
Vigilantes
Baseball teams established in 1997
Baseball teams disestablished in 1998
Professional baseball teams in California
1997 establishments in California
Defunct independent baseball league teams
1998 disestablishments in California
Defunct baseball teams in California